VisualFEA is a finite element analysis software program for Microsoft Windows and Mac OS X. It is developed and distributed by Intuition Software, Inc. of South Korea, and used chiefly for structural and geotechnical analysis. Its strongest point is its intuitive, user-friendly design based on graphical pre- and postprocessing capabilities. It has educational features for teaching and learning structural mechanics, and finite element analysis through graphical simulation. It is widely used in college-level courses related to structural mechanics and finite element methods.

Overview
VisualFEA is a full-fledged finite element analysis program with many easy-to-use but powerful features, which can be classified largely into four parts: finite element processing, pre-processing, post-processing and educational simulation.  All the functions are integrated into a single executable module, which is a characteristic of the program distinguished from other finite element analysis programs generally composed of multiple modules.  The whole procedure from pre-processing to analysis, and to post-processing can be completed on the spot without launching one program after another, or without pipelining data from one program to another.

Processing
VisualFEA can solve the following types of problems.
 Mechanical analysis
Truss, frame, plane stress, plane strain, axisymmetric, plate bending, shell and 3D solid 
Linear, material nonlinear or geometric nonlinear analysis
Static or dynamic analysis
Construction staged analysis
Geotechnical analysis (consolidation, slope stability analysis)
 Heat conduction analysis
Plane, axisymmetric and 3D volume
Steady state or transient analysis
Linear or nonlinear material model
Fire damage analysis
 Seepage analysis
Plane, axisymmetric and 3D volume
Steady state or transient analysis
Confined or unconfined boundary condition
 Coupled analysis
Heat conduction coupled mechanical analysis
Seepage coupled mechanical analysis

Pre-processing
A finite element model in VisualFEA consists of various objects: curve, primitive surface, node, element and mesh. VisualFEA has its own CAD-like capabilities of creating graphical objects without aid of external programs. VisualFEA can create structured or unstructured meshes in two- or three-dimensional space using the following mesh generation schemes.
 Mapping scheme (lofting, tri-mapping, transfinite mapping, isoparametric mapping)  
 Sweeping scheme (extrusion, translation, rotation, twisting)
 Auto mesh scheme (triangulation, tetrahedronization)
 Mesh treatment (mesh carving, mesh operation, intersection, distortion)
The program has the function to save the generated mesh data in text format for use by other application programs. Other pre-processing capabilities include the following items.
 Definition and assignment of boundary conditions, material properties and element joints, etc.
 Node number or element number optimization
 Handling of element orientation, local coordinate axes

Post-processing
VisualFEA has various functions of visualizing the numerical data generated by solving the analysis models.  The most frequently used graphical representation of the data are the contour and vector images.  There are many other forms of graphical representation available in VisualFEA.

 Iso-surface
 Sliced plane, parallel plane, cross plane
 Diagram (bending moment diagram, shear force diagram, etc.)
 Curve plotting
 Data probing
 Animation

Educational Simulation
VisualFEA can be used as a tool for computer-aided education of structural mechanics and finite element method.  The tools are operated with the user-created modeling data and their ensuing analysis results on the basis of finite element technology.  They are devised to promote the understanding, and to stimulate the interest in the subjects by substantiating the conceptual principles and visually exhibiting the complex computational processes with the aid of interactive computer graphics.  The topics covered by the educational functions are as follows.
 Mathematical relationships of internal forces in rigid frames.
 Geometric properties of an arbitrarily defined member section
 Stresses on the member sections
 Moving load
 Mohr circle and its application to elasto-plastic yielding.
 Stress path and yield surface
 Buckling
 Stiffness assembly and solution process in the finite element analysis.
 Shape function and interpolation
 Eigen value analysis.
 Concept of adaptive analysis

VisualFEA/CBT
VisualFEA/CBT is an educational version of the program published by John Wiley and Son's Inc. as a companion program to a textbook on finite element method. The program has the limitation of 3000 nodes that can be handled.

References

External links
 Intuition Software, Inc.
 Screen Demos, Internet-First University Press, Cornell University
 VisualFEA Tutorial YouTube Channel

Finite element method
Structural engineering
Engineering education